Berkeley was a car manufacturer that traded in 1913, building 18 hp cars. The engine was quoted as a 75x100, 1764 cc unit of unknown origin and the nominal list price was £120. Little else is known of them.

See also
 List of car manufacturers of the United Kingdom

References

Defunct motor vehicle manufacturers of the United Kingdom